Same-sex marriage in the Falkland Islands has been legal since 29 April 2017. A law to permit same-sex couples to marry passed the Legislative Assembly on 30 March, and was given royal assent by Governor Colin Roberts on 13 April. The territory also recognises civil partnerships, open to both same-sex and different-sex couples.

The Falkland Islands was the seventh British Overseas Territory to legalise same-sex marriage, and the third civilian one to do so, after the Pitcairn Islands and Gibraltar.

Background
First claimed by the Kingdom of Great Britain in 1765, the Falkland Islands was periodically garrisoned by British, French and Spanish forces until 1811 when all the garrisons were withdrawn. In 1833, the British reasserted its sovereignty over the Falklands, and a civilian population was invited to stay on the islands.

The Marriage Ordinance 1949, applying to both the Falkland Islands and South Georgia and the South Sandwich Islands, was enacted on 31 December 1949. The ordinance provided for the issuance of marriage licenses and empowered the Governor of the Falkland Islands to appoint registrars to conduct the marriage ceremony. The ordinance did not explicitly ban same-sex marriage, nor did it define the term "marriage". Nonetheless, a marriage between persons of the same sex was considered void ab initio in common law, and as such same-sex couples could not marry on the islands. The ordinance was repealed in 1996 and replaced with the Marriage Ordinance 1996, which did not contain any changes with regards to the recognition of same-sex unions.

Same-sex marriage law
On 13 May 2015, the Attorney General of the Falkland Islands, Mark Lewis, recommended that the Executive Council consider the legalisation of same-sex marriage or civil partnerships in the territory. On 13 January 2016, following a public consultation, the Council instructed the Attorney General to prepare an amendment to the island's marriage ordinance to permit same-sex marriages. 90% of the participants to the consultation supported same-sex marriage, and 94% were in favour of civil partnerships for all couples.

The Attorney General's draft amendment was considered by the Executive Council on 22 February 2017. The Council instructed Lewis to publish it in the official gazette, thereby commencing the legislative process as a first reading, as well as to prepare further legislation necessary to its implementation. On 30 March 2017, the Legislative Assembly approved the same-sex marriage bill by a 7 to 1 vote. The law, supported by MLAs Jan Cheek, Roger Edwards, Barry Elsby, Ian Hansen, Michael Poole, Phyl Rendell, and Gavin Short, but opposed by MLA Mike Summers, allows same-sex couples to marry and access civil partnerships. It received royal assent by Governor Colin Roberts on 13 April, and went into effect on 29 April 2017. A community event to celebrate the legalisation of same-sex marriage took place in Stanley that same day.

Sections 3A(1) and Section 3B of the marriage ordinance state:

The Interpretation and General Clauses Ordinance was amended to state that '"marriage" includes a same sex marriage solemnised or recognised under the Marriage Ordinance 1996', and state that all references to "husband", "wife", "husband and wife", and "widow and widower" in all other ordinances are to be read as including same-sex couples. In law, a civil partnership is defined as "a relationship between a man and a woman or two people of the same sex ("civil partners") which is formed when they register as civil partners of each other". Civil partnerships performed abroad, such as in the United Kingdom, are recognised in the Falkland Islands.

The first same-sex marriage was performed at Christina Bay near Cape Pembroke on 20 November 2017.

See also
 LGBT rights in the Falkland Islands
 Same-sex marriage in the United Kingdom
 Recognition of same-sex unions in the British Overseas Territories

References

Falkland Islands
2017 in LGBT history
LGBT rights in the Falkland Islands
Falkland Islands